Janne Kettunen (born August 11, 1994) is a Finnish professional ice hockey player who currently plays with Nybro IF of the HockeyEttan.

Career
Kettunen made his Liiga debut playing with SaiPa during the 2015-16 Liiga season.

Career statistics

Regular season and playoffs

References

External links

1994 births
Living people
SaiPa players
Rovaniemen Kiekko players
Finnish ice hockey forwards
People from Lappeenranta
JYP Jyväskylä players
HK Dukla Trenčín players
Nybro Vikings players
Finnish expatriate ice hockey players in Slovakia
Sportspeople from South Karelia
Finnish expatriate ice hockey players in Sweden